Stephen Saunders may refer to:

 Stephen Saunders (British Army officer) (1947–2000), British military attache based in Greece
 Stephen Saunders (24 character), character in U.S. TV series 24
 Stephen Saunders (entrepreneur), entrepreneur, author, and media consultant
 Steven Saunders, pseudonym of British children's writer Allan Frewin Jones (born 1954)
 Steve Saunders (footballer) (born 1964), English footballer

See also
 Steve Sanders (disambiguation)
 Steven Saunders (born 1991), Scottish footballer